1838 in sports describes the year's events in world sport.

Boxing
Events
 3 April — in his return fight with Ben Caunt, William "Bendigo" Thompson is disqualified in the 75th round for going down without being struck. 
 Caunt claims the English Championship after defeating Bendigo but is not recognised because of the prior claim of James Burke, who has now returned to England from America; meanwhile, Jem Ward continues his refusal to formally surrender the title even though he has long retired.
 Publication of the London Prize Ring Rules of 1838 which succeed and are built upon the Broughton Rules of 1743.

Cricket
Events
 Melbourne Cricket Club is founded; it is generally regarded as the oldest sporting club in Australia
England
 Most runs – Charles Taylor 339 @ 16.95 (HS 73)
 Most wickets – James Cobbett 71 (BB 8–?)

Football
Events
 A pupil at Rugby School called Jem Mackie is noted for his "running in" ability and this is understood to be the equivalent of try scoring, which is evidence of a distinct handling game.

Horse racing
England
 Grand National – Sir William
 1,000 Guineas Stakes – Barcarolle 
 2,000 Guineas Stakes – Grey Momus
 The Derby – Amato
 The Oaks – Industry 
 St. Leger Stakes – Don John

Rowing
The Boat Race
 The Oxford and Cambridge Boat Race is not held this year
Other
 In the U.S. six men of Providence, Rhode Island establish the Narragansett Boat Club on the tidal Seekonk River.

References

 
Sports by year